Ohio Mayor's Courts are state courts in Ohio created by some municipalities. The  Mayor's Courts hear traffic cases, violations of city ordinances and other misdemeanors. The presiding officer is a magistrate (not a judge) appointed by the mayor, or even being the mayor, and paid by the city or village. 

Mayor's Courts are not considered trial courts or courts of record and are not subject to the supervision of the Ohio Supreme Court. Mayor's Courts are not authorized to conduct jury trials. If a defendant is entitled to and desires a jury trial, then the case is transferred to the jurisdiction's trial court of limited jurisdiction (Municipal Court or County Court). 

There has been criticism of the courts. The majority of revenue generated from fines and court costs go to the city or village, in contrast to fines and court costs levied by the municipal court or county court. The late Chief Justice of the Ohio Supreme Court Thomas J. Moyer pointed out that the United States Court of Appeals for the Sixth Circuit ruled that there is an unconstitutional conflict of interest for a mayor to levy a fine paid into a budget that the mayor himself controls.

List of Mayor's Courts
The following 260 Ohio jurisdictions have Mayor's Courts:

Adams County – (2) Peebles, West Union
Allen County – (4) Cairo, Delphos, Elida, Fort Shawnee 
Ashland County – (1) Loudonville
Ashtabula County – (3) Andover, Geneva-on-the-Lake, North Kingsville
Athens County – (1) Coolville, Nelsonville
Auglaize County – (2) Minster, New Knoxville
Belmont County – (5) Bellaire, Martins Ferry, Powhatan Point, Shadyside, St. Clairsville
Brown County – (3) Georgetown, Ripley, Hamersville
Butler County  (2) Monroe, Trenton
Carroll County – None
Champaign County – (3) Mechanicsburg, North Lewisburg, St. Paris
Clark County – (2) Enon, South Charleston
Clermont County – (8) Amelia, Bethel, Felicity, Loveland, Milford, New Richmond, Owensville, Williamsburg
Clinton County – None
Columbiana County – (2) Hanoverton, Summitville
Coshocton County – None
Crawford County – (1) Crestline
Cuyahoga County: (18) Beachwood, Brecksville, Broadview Heights, Brook Park, Brooklyn Heights, Chagrin Falls, Glenwillow, Highland Hills, Independence, Middleburg Heights, Newburgh Heights, North Royalton, Oakwood Village, Orange, Seven Hills, Valley View, Walton Hills, Woodmere
Darke County – (1) Union City
Defiance County – None
Delaware County – (2) Shawnee Hills, Sunbury
Erie County – (2) Kelley's Island, Milan
Fairfield County – (2) Lithopolis, Pickerington, Sugar Grove
Fayette County – None
Franklin County- (17) Bexley, Canal Winchester, Dublin, Gahanna, Grandview Heights, Grove City, Groveport, Hilliard, Marble Cliff, New Albany, Obetz, Reynoldsburg, Upper Arlington, Valleyview, Westerville, Whitehall, Worthington
Fulton County – None
Gallia County – None
Geauga County – None
Greene County – (1) Yellow Springs
Guernsey County – (2)  Byesville, Senecaville,
Hamilton County – (23) Amberley, Arlington Heights, Blue Ash, Cheviot, Cleves, Fairfax, Forest Park, Golf Manor, Harrison, Indian Hill, Madeira, Montgomery, Mount Healthy, Newtown, North College Hill, Norwood, Reading, Sharonville, Silverton, Springdale, Saint Bernard, Terrace Park, Wyoming
Hancock County – None
Hardin County – None
Harrison County – None
Henry County – None
Highland County – None
Hocking County – (2) Laurelville, Murray City
Holmes County – None
Huron County – (1) Plymouth
Jackson County – (1) Coalton
Jefferson County – (7) Bergholz, Dillonvale, Empire, Mingo Junction, New Alexandria, Stratton, Wintersville
Knox County – None
Lake County – (6) Fairport Harbor, Grand River, Madison, Perry, Willoughby Hills
Lawrence County – (5) Chesapeake, Coal Grove, Hanging Rock, Proctorville, South Point
Licking County – (10) Alexandria, Buckeye Lake, Granville, Hartford, Hebron, Johnstown, Kirkersville, Pataskala, St. Louisville, Utica
Logan County – (1) Russells Point
Lorain County – (6) Avon, Grafton, Lagrange, North Ridgeville, Sheffield, Sheffield Lake 
Lucas County – (1) Berkey
Madison County – (1) Mount Sterling
Mahoning County – (4) Canfield, Lowellville, New Middletown, Poland
Marion County – None
Medina County – (3) Brunswick, Seville, Westfield Center
Meigs County – (5) Middleport, Pomeroy, Racine, Rutland, Syracuse
Mercer County – (3) Coldwater, Rockford, St. Henry
Miami County – (2) Bradford, Fletcher
Monroe County – (1) Woodsfield
Montgomery County – (3) Moraine, Phillipsburg, West Carrollton
Morgan County – (2) Malta, McConnelsville
Morrow County – (3) Cardington, Edison, Mount Gilead
Muskingum County – (5) Dresden, Frazeysburg, New Concord, Roseville, South Zanesville
Noble County – None
Ottawa County – (2) Put-in-Bay, Wayne
Paulding County – (4) Antwerp, Oakwood, Paulding, Payne
Perry County – (8) Corning, Crooksville, Junction City, New Lexington, New Straitsville, Shawnee, Somerset, Thornville
Pickaway County – (4) Ashville, Commercial Point, New Holland, South Bloomfield
Pike County – (2) Piketon, Waverly
Portage County – (1) Mogadore
Preble County – (3) Camden, Gratis, West Elkton
Putnam County – (1) Columbus Grove
Richland County – (6) Bellville, Butler, Lexington, Lucas, Ontario, Shiloh
Ross County – None
Sandusky County – (2) Bellevue, Fremont
Scioto County – (1) New Boston
Seneca County – (3) Bloomville, Green Springs, Republic
Shelby County – (4) Anna, Jackson Center, Port Jefferson, Russia
Stark County – (7) East Canton, East Sparta, Hartville, Louisville, Minerva, North Canton, Waynesburg
Summit County – (8) Boston Heights, Cuyahoga Falls, Fairlawn, Macedonia, Northfield, Norton, Peninsula, Richfield
Trumbull County – (2) Hubbard, McDonald
Tuscarawas County – (2) Midvale, Port Washington
Union County – None
Van Wert County – None
Vinton County – (1) McArthur
Warren County – (7) Carlisle, Harveysburg, Maineville, Morrow, South Lebanon, Springboro, Waynesville
Washington County – (3) Belpre, Beverly, Matamoras
Wayne County – (7) Creston, Doylestown, Marshallville, Mount Eaton, Shreve, Smithville, West Salem
Williams County – None
Wood County – (9) Bloomdale, Bradner, Haskins, North Baltimore, Northwood, Portage, Risingsun, Walbridge, West Millgrove
Wyandot County – None

References

External links
"Murky Future In Store For Ohio Mayor's Courts", Hudsonhubtimes.com, 11-14-2007.
The Guide to Ohio Courts last retrieved June 10, 2009.
The Supreme Court of Ohio: Mayor’s Courts Summary 2007

Ohio state courts